Karrasch may refer to:

Karaś, Warmian-Masurian Voivodeship, Poland

People with the surname
Audrey Karrasch, contestant on season 4 of The Voice
Haimish Karrasch (born 1976), Australian Olympic rower